Bilel Chabbar (Arabic:بلال شبار; born 31 March 2000) is a Tunisian professional footballer who plays as a defender for EO Sidi Bouzid on loan from Espérance de Tunis.

References

External links
 

2000 births
Living people
Association football defenders
Tunisian footballers
Espérance Sportive de Tunis players
EO Sidi Bouzid players
Tunisian Ligue Professionnelle 1 players